The Road to El Dorado is a 2000 American animated adventure film produced by DreamWorks Animation and released by DreamWorks Pictures. It was the third animated feature produced by DreamWorks. The film was directed by Eric "Bibo" Bergeron and Don Paul (in their feature directorial debuts), with additional sequences directed by Will Finn and David Silverman, while the film's screenplay was written by the writing team of Ted Elliott and Terry Rossio. The film stars the voices of  Kevin Kline, Kenneth Branagh, Rosie Perez, Armand Assante, and Edward James Olmos.

The soundtrack features an instrumental score composed by Hans Zimmer and John Powell, and songs written by Elton John and Tim Rice. John is also credited periodically narrating the story in song throughout the film. The film follows two con artists who, after winning the map to El Dorado in Spain, wash ashore in the New World, where they use the map to lead them to the city of El Dorado, where its inhabitants mistake them for gods.

The Road to El Dorado was released on March 31, 2000 to mixed reviews from critics and performed poorly at the box office, grossing $76 million worldwide on a production budget of about $95 million. Despite its initial reception, re-evaluation in later years has resulted in The Road to El Dorado gaining a cult following.

Plot

In 1519 Spain, con-artists Miguel and Tulio win a map to the legendary City of Gold, El Dorado, in a rigged dice gamble (though they ironically win the map fairly after Tulio was given normal dice from one of the opponents). After their con is exposed, the two evade the guards and accidentally stow away on one of the ships to be led by conquistador Hernán Cortés for the New World. At sea, they are caught and imprisoned, but break free and steal a rowboat with the help of Cortés' mistreated horse, Altivo.

Their boat reaches land, where Miguel begins to recognize landmarks from the map, leading them to a totem marker near a waterfall that Tulio believes is a dead end. As they prepare to leave, they encounter a native woman, Chel, being chased by guards. When the guards see Tulio and Miguel riding Altivo as depicted on the totem, they escort them and Chel to a secret entrance behind the falls, into El Dorado. They are brought to the city's elders, kindhearted Chief Tannabok and wicked high priest Tzekel-Kan. The pair are mistaken for gods when a volcano coincidentally erupts but simultaneously stops during an argument between them and they are given luxurious quarters, along with the charge of Chel. She discovers that the two are conning her people, but promises to remain quiet if they take her with them when they leave the city. The two are showered with gifts of gold from Tannabok, but disapprove of Tzekel-Kan attempting to sacrifice a civilian at the gods' ritual. Meanwhile, Cortés and his men reach land.

Tulio and Miguel instruct Tannabok to build them a boat so that they can leave the city with all the gifts they have been given, under the ruse that they are needed back in the 'other world'. Chel gets romantically close to Tulio, while Miguel explores the city, coming to appreciate the peaceful life embraced by the citizens; when Tzekel-Kan sees Miguel playing a ball game with children, he insists the "gods" demonstrate their powers against the city's best players. Tulio and Miguel are outmatched, but Chel replaces the ball with an armadillo, allowing them to win. Miguel spares the ritual of sacrificing the losing team and berates Tzekel-Kan, to the crowd's approval and earning Tannabok's respect. Tzekel-Kan notices Miguel received a cut during the game and realizes the pair are not gods since gods do not bleed, hence the reason for the sacrifices. Afterward, Miguel, who has by then reconsidered leaving the city, overhears Tulio telling Chel that he would like her to come with them to Spain, before adding he would like her to come with specifically him and to forget Miguel – straining the relationship between the two. At a party being thrown for them, Miguel and Tulio begin to argue about Tulio and Chel's conversation and Miguel's desire to stay when Tzekel-Kan conjures a giant stone jaguar to chase them throughout the city. Tulio and Miguel manage to outwit the jaguar, causing it and Tzekel-Kan to fall into a giant whirlpool, thought by the natives to be the entrance to Xibalba, the spirit world. Tzekel-Kan then surfaces in the jungle, where he encounters Cortés and his men. Believing Cortés to be the real god, Tzekel-Kan offers to lead him to El Dorado.

Miguel decides to stay in the city while Tulio and Chel board the completed boat, before they see smoke on the horizon and realize Cortés is approaching. Suspecting the city will be destroyed if Cortés discovers it, Tulio suggests using the boat to ram the rock pillars under the waterfall and block the main entrance to the city, despite knowing they will lose the gold in the process. The plan succeeds with the citizens pulling over a statue in the boat's wake to give it enough speed. As the statue starts to fall too quickly, Tulio has difficulty in preparing the boat's sail. Forfeiting his ability to stay in the city, Miguel and Altivo jump onto the boat to unfurl the sails, assuring the boat clears the statue in time. The group successfully crashes against the pillars, causing a cave-in, while losing all their gifts in the process. They hide near the totem just as Cortés' men and Tzekel-Kan arrive. When they find the entrance blocked, Cortés brands Tzekel-Kan a liar and leaves away by taking him as a slave. Tulio and Miguel, though disappointed they lost the gold (unaware that Altivo still wears the golden horseshoes with which he was outfitted in El Dorado), have appreciated the thrill of their adventure, and head in a different direction for a new adventure with Chel.

Voice cast
 Kevin Kline as Tulio, a con artist and Miguel’s friend. He is the strategic planner, often becoming anxious and overthinking things.
 Kenneth Branagh as Miguel, a con artist and Tulio’s friend. Miguel is more relaxed and laid-back in contrast to Tulio’s more frantic nature. Miguel becomes accustomed to the peaceful life in El Dorado and values the city’s people as opposed to the gold
 Rosie Perez as Chel, a beautiful woman from El Dorado who discovers Tulio and Miguel's con and decides to play along in hopes of helping them escape El Dorado.
 Armand Assante as Tzekel-Kan, the fanatically vicious high priest who has a religious fixation for human sacrifices. He initially believes Tulio and Miguel are gods until he discovers the truth.
 Edward James Olmos as Chief Tannabok, the skeptical, yet kind chief of El Dorado who realizes that Tulio and Miguel are not gods, but treats them with kindness and hospitality because of the good they show to his people.
 Jim Cummings as Hernán Cortés, the merciless and ambitious conquistador leader of the expedition to find the empires of the New World.
 Cummings also voices the cook on Cortés's ship, a warrior who gets stepped on by Tzekel-Kan's stone jaguar, and the native who warns Chief Tannabok about Cortés. 
 Frank Welker as Altivo, Cortés' horse who befriends Tulio and Miguel. 
 Welker also voices the Bull that chases Miguel and Tulio at the beginning of the movie.
 Tobin Bell as Zaragoza, a sailor on the voyage to the New World of El Dorado and the original owner of the map, which he loses to Tulio and Miguel after a game of dice.
 Elton John as The Singing Narrator.
 Anne Lockhart as Girl in Barcelona (uncredited)
 Bob Bergen as Jaguar (uncredited)
 Duncan Marjoribanks as Acolyte

Production

Development
Shortly before the public announcement of DreamWorks SKG in October 1994, former Disney chairman Jeffrey Katzenberg met with screenwriters Ted Elliott and Terry Rossio and gave them a copy of Hugh Thomas's book Conquest: Montezuma, Cortes and the Fall of Old Mexico, desiring to make an animated film set in the Age of Discovery. By the spring of 1995, Elliott and Rossio devised a story treatment inspired by the Bob Hope and Bing Crosby Road to... films with self-interested, comedic anti-heroes who would set out to find the Lost City of Gold after acquiring a map to its location. Will Finn and David Silverman were originally the film's directors with a tentative release scheduled for fall 1999. Originally, the story was conceived as a dramatic film due to Katzenberg's penchant for large-scale animated films, which conflicted with the film's lighthearted elements. This version of the story had Miguel initially conceived as a raunchy Sancho Panza-like character who died, but came back to life so much that the natives assumed he was a god, as well as steamier love sequences and scanty clothing designed for Chel. In Elliott and Rossio's treatment, the film was meant to end with Miguel and Tulio saving the Mayan people from Spanish conquistador Hernán Cortés as it would abandon its civilization to live in the nearby jungle amidst the tragic backdrop of the destruction of its culture.

However, while The Prince of Egypt was in production, Katzenberg decided that their next animated project should be a departure from its serious, adult approach, and desired for the film to be an adventure comedy. Because of this, the film was put on hold, where it was jokingly referred to as El Dorado: The Lost City on Hold due to several rewrites. Miguel and Tulio were rewritten as petty swindlers, and the setting of the film was changed to a more luscious paradise. Additionally, the romance was toned down, and new clothing was designed for Chel. Producer Bonnie Radford explained, "We originally thought it would be rated PG-13 and so we skewed it to that group...But then we thought we could not exclude the younger kids so we had to tone the romance down." Finn and Silverman left the project in 1998 following disputes over the film's creative direction, and were replaced by Eric "Bibo" Bergeron and Don Paul. Katzenberg reportedly co-directed the film albeit uncredited.

Casting
On August 15, 1998, Kevin Kline, Kenneth Branagh, and Rosie Perez had signed onto the film. Because the characters and film drew from the Bob Hope and Bing Crosby Road to ... films, producer Bonne Radford remarked that "[t]he buddy relationship [between the duo] is the very heart of the story. They need each other because they're both pretty inept. They're opposites — Tulio is the schemer and Miguel is the dreamer. Their camaraderie adds to the adventure; you almost don't need to know where they're going or what they're after, because the fun is in the journey." Unusual for an animated film, Kline and Branagh recorded their lines in the same studio room together, in order for the two to achieve more realistic chemistry. This resulted in a good deal of improvised dialogue, some of which ended up in the film.

Animation
Early into production, a team of designers, animators, producers, and Katzenberg embarked on research trips to Mexico where they studied ancient Mayan cities of Tulum, Chichen Itza, and Uxmal in hopes of making the film's architecture look authentic. By January 1997, one hundred animators were assigned onto the project. However, because the animation department was occupied with The Prince of Egypt, the studio devoted more animators and resources on that film than on Road to El Dorado. Additional fine line animation was outsourced to Stardust Pictures in London and Bardel Entertainment in Vancouver. The creation sequence in the film, possibly the opening number by Elton John, was provided with traditional animation and CGI provided by Pacific Data Images.

Music

Marylata Jacob, who started DreamWorks' music department in 1995, became the film's music supervisor before the script was completed. Consulting with Katzenberg, Jacob decided the musical approach to the film would be world music. In 1996, Tim Rice and Elton John were asked to compose seven songs which they immediately worked on. Their musical process began with Rice first writing the song lyrics and giving them to John to compose the music. John then recorded a demo which was given to the animators who storyboarded to the demo as the tempo and vocals would remain intact.

Eventually, the filmmakers decided not to follow the traditional musical approach by having the characters sing. Co-producer Bonne Radford explained, "We were trying to break free of that pattern that had been kind of adhered to in animation and really put a song where we thought it would be great... and get us through some story points." On February 20, 1999, before the release of Elton John and Tim Rice's Aida, it was announced that ten songs had been composed for El Dorado, and that the release date had been pushed to March 2000.

The instrumental score was composed by Hans Zimmer and John Powell. John, Rice, and Zimmer had previously collaborated on the soundtrack to Disney's The Lion King, another animated film. Zimmer had also previously composed the music score to DreamWorks Animation's previous film The Prince of Egypt.

In some instances (such as "The Trail We Blaze"), the songs have been altered musically and vocally from the way they appeared in the film. A "Cast & Crew Special Edition" recording of the soundtrack exists, but was a promo-only release. It includes the theatrical versions of the songs, including "It's Tough to Be a God" recorded by Kevin Kline and Kenneth Branagh (performed on the soundtrack by Elton John and Randy Newman), and several of the score tracks by Hans Zimmer. The Backstreet Boys provided uncredited backing vocals on "Friends Never Say Goodbye", the group is "thanked" by John following the credits in the CD booklet. The Eagles members Don Henley and Timothy B. Schmit are credited as background vocalists on the song "Without Question".

Release

Marketing
The film was first revealed in a double trailer with fellow DreamWorks animated feature Chicken Run on the home video of The Prince of Egypt. It was accompanied by a promotional campaign by Burger King.

Home media
The Road to El Dorado was released on DVD and VHS on December 12, 2000. There was also an event in El Dorado, Kansas in which the streets were painted gold and gold coins were donated to the city to build a movie theater. The DVD release includes an audio commentary, behind-the-scenes featurettes, music video of "Someday Out of Blue", production notes, interactive games, trailers and television spots. In July 2014, the film's distribution rights were purchased by DreamWorks Animation from Paramount Pictures (owners of the pre-2011 DreamWorks Pictures catalog) and transferred to 20th Century Fox before reverting to Universal Pictures in 2018. Because of this, Universal Pictures Home Entertainment subsequently released the film on Blu-ray on January 22, 2019.

Reception

Critical response
On Rotten Tomatoes, the film has an approval rating of 48% based on 106 reviews and an average rating of 5.50/10. The site's critical consensus reads, "Predictable story and thin characters made the movie flat." On Metacritic, the film has a score of 51 out of 100 based on 29 critics, indicating "mixed or average reviews". Audiences polled by CinemaScore gave the film an average grade of "B+" on an A+ to F scale.

Reviewing for the Chicago Tribune, Michael Wilmington summarized that "This movie is fun to watch in ways that most recent cartoons aren't. It's also more adult, though it's the same cartoonish sensuality as the original 'Road' movies, with their heavily coded prurience. It's a high-spirited movie, though it's not for all tastes. The John-Rice score isn't as rousingly on-target as The Lion King. The script, while clever, often seems too cute and show-biz snazzy, not emotional enough." 

Lisa Schwarzbaum, reviewing for Entertainment Weekly, remarked that "this trip down The Road to El Dorado proceeds under the speed limit all the way. Our Tulio and Miguel aren't big enough, nor strong enough, nor funny enough to buckle any swashes. They're as lost to us as the lost city into which they stumble." Similarly, animation historian Charles Solomon remarked on the lack of character development writing "Tulio and Miguel move nicely, but the animators don't seem to have any more idea who they are than the audience does. Kevin Kline and Kenneth Branagh supply their voices, but the characters say and do similar things in similar ways. Who can tell them apart?" Paul Clinton of CNN wrote, "The animation is uninspiring and brings nothing new to the table of animation magic," praising the Elton John/Tim Rice songs, but noting the weak plot.

Among the film's more positive reviewers was Roger Ebert of the Chicago Sun-Times, who gave the film three stars out of four. He acknowledged that although The Road to El Dorado is not "as quirky as Antz or as grown up as The Prince of Egypt", it is "bright and has good energy, and the kinds of witty asides that entertain the adults in between the margins of the stuff for the kids." Joel Siegel, reviewing on the television program Good Morning America, called it "solid gold," claiming the film was "paved with laughs." Jay Boyar of the Orlando Sentinel stated "The Road to El Dorado is borderline entertaining, I suppose, with animation that is, at times, truly impressive. And if the six Elton John/Tim Rice songs are thoroughly forgettable, they lack sufficient distinction to actually become annoying."

In more recent years, Jason Schwartz of Geeks called the film "a hidden gem", and was taken aback at "how well it has aged and how baffling it is that this movie wasn't a success." He called the film "beautifully animated", and praised the Elton John songs/Hans Zimmer soundtrack. He also praised the characterizations writing, "Miguel and Tulio play off each other effortlessly. Not only does the humor between the two of them flow well, but their friendship is authentic." Petrana Radulovic, writing for Polygon, praised the characters of Miguel and Tulio, as well as the "hilarious scenes and quippy dialogue."

Indigenous rights organizations criticized the movie for its sexist and racist themes, and for its lack of historical sensitivity. Olin Tezcatlipoca, director of the Mexica Movement, pointed out that the movie portrays Chel as a "sex toy" for the two Spaniards, and that the representation of them as saviors from the barbarity of human sacrifices and from indigenous collaborationism with Cortés "has no respect for history."

Box office
The film grossed $12.9 million on opening weekend ranking second behind Erin Brockovichs third weekend. The film closed on June 29, 2000, after earning $50.9 million in the United States and Canada and $25.5 million overseas for a worldwide total of $76.4 million. Based on its total gross, The Road to El Dorado was a box-office bomb, unable to recoup its $95 million budget.

Accolades

Internet popularity
Twenty years after the film's release, The Road to El Dorado had an unexpected rise in popularity as an Internet meme. Petrana Radulovic, writing for Polygon, noted a range of memes and GIFs of moments from the film, writing that it "found a second life and a long-lasting legacy, since it came out at the perfect time to make it a nostalgic movie for people who grew up with the internet."

References

External links

 
 
 
 

2000 films
2000 comedy films
2000 fantasy films
2000 animated films
2000 directorial debut films
2000s adventure comedy films
2000s American animated films
2000s children's animated films
2000s fantasy adventure films
2000s musical comedy films
American adventure comedy films
American buddy comedy films
American children's animated adventure films
American children's animated comedy films
American children's animated fantasy films
American children's animated musical films
American fantasy adventure films
American fantasy comedy films
American musical comedy films
American musical fantasy films
Animated buddy films
Animated films about friendship
Films about conquistadors
Films set in Mesoamerica
Films set in Mexico
Films set in Seville
Films set in Spain
Films set in the 1510s
Mexico in fiction
Cultural depictions of Hernán Cortés
DreamWorks Animation animated films
DreamWorks Pictures films
Films directed by Bibo Bergeron
Films directed by Will Finn
Films directed by David Silverman
Films scored by Hans Zimmer
Films scored by John Powell
Films with screenplays by Ted Elliott
Films with screenplays by Terry Rossio
The Road to El Dorado
Film and television memes
2000s English-language films